The 1922 United States Senate election in Texas was held on November 7, 1922. Incumbent Democratic U.S. Senator Charles Culberson ran for re-election to a fifth term, but lost the Democratic primary. A runoff between former Governor Pa Ferguson and Railroads Commissioner Earle Bradford Mayfield.

In the runoff, Mayfield, a member of the Texas Railroad Commission defeated Ferguson for the Democratic nomination, then tantamount to election in Texas as a legacy of the American Civil War. Mayfield had the support of the resurgent Ku Klux Klan, and anti-Klan activists in the Democratic Party including George Peddy were unable to have him stripped of the nomination. Peddy agreed to run against Mayfield as the candidate of the "Independent Democrats", members of the party who opposed the Klan. The Texas Republican Party also backed Peddy, but was unable to have him included on the general election ballot as their official nominee.

Peddy ran a write-in campaign as the candidate of the Independent Democrats and Republicans. In the general election, he ran a surprisingly strong race and held Mayfield to a smaller margin than was usual for Texas Democrats, but Mayfield defeated him 264,260 votes (66.9%) to 130,744 (33.1%). Peddy challenged Mayfield's election, and the subsequent Senate investigation prevented Mayfield from taking his seat as scheduled on March 4, 1923. Mayfield assumed his seat on December 3, 1923, and was sworn in pending a resolution to Peddy's challenge, which was ultimately denied on February 4, 1925.

Democratic primary

Candidates
Charles Allen Culberson, incumbent U.S. Senator since 1899
James E. "Pa" Ferguson, former Governor of Texas (1915–17)
Robert Lee Henry, former U.S. Representative from Waco (1897–1917)
Earle Bradford Mayfield, member of the Railroad Commission of Texas and former State Senator from Tyler
Cullen F. Thomas, Dallas attorney
Charles Ousley

Withdrawn
Sterling P. Strong, traveling salesman and former Montague County Clerk

Results

Runoff

General election

Results

See also 
 1922 United States Senate elections

References

Texas
1922
Senate